Dorothy Rahman is a Bangladesh Awami League politician and a Member of the Bangladesh Parliament from the reserved women's seat-19.

Career 
Rahman was elected to Parliament for a  "reserved seat" as a Bangladesh Awami League candidate in 2022 after the seat fell vacant following the demise of AL lawmaker Sheikh Anne Rahman. She was sworn in on November 16, 2022.

References 

Living people
Year of birth missing (living people)
Awami League politicians
Women members of the Jatiya Sangsad
11th Jatiya Sangsad members
21st-century Bangladeshi women politicians